Benjamin Willis (born January 1, 1996) is an American soccer player.

Career

Youth and college 
Willis played four years of college soccer at Gonzaga University between 2014 and 2018, including a red-shirted year in 2014, making 56 appearances.

While at college, Willis appeared for USL Premier Development League side Lane United in 2016 and 2017, and Seattle Sounders FC U-23 in 2018.

Professional 
On February 8, 2019, Willis signed for USL Championship side Rio Grande Valley FC. Willis earned his first career win and shutout against Oklahoma City Energy on October 13. Willis won USL Save of the Week in Week 26 of the USL Championship Season. He finished second in voting for USL Championship Save of the Month in September. He was also a finalist for USL Championship Week 33 Save of the Week.

Coaching 
After retiring from professional soccer, Willis most recently coached for Bellevue College in the NWAC. He moved on and is now coaching for Ballard FC in the USL League Two. He is the Ballard FC Goalkeeper coach. During the college seasons, he is a current assistant coach and goalkeeper coach for the women's soccer team at University of Puget Sound.

References

External links 
  Gonzaga bio
  RGVFC Toros bio

1996 births
Living people
American soccer players
Association football goalkeepers
Gonzaga Bulldogs men's soccer players
Lane United FC players
People from Federal Way, Washington
Rio Grande Valley FC Toros players
Seattle Sounders FC U-23 players
Soccer players from Washington (state)
Sportspeople from King County, Washington
USL Championship players
USL League Two players